Son Jun-ho (born 12 May 1992) is a South Korean footballer who plays as central midfielder for Shandong Taishan.

Club career
Son Jun-ho would play for Youngnam University, before joining top tier club Pohang Steelers at the start of the 2014 K League Classic season. He would make his professional debut on 26 March 2014 in a league game against Jeonbuk Hyundai Motors that ended in a 3-1 victory. Three days later he would go on to score his first goal in a league game on 29 March 2014 against Sangju Sangmu FC in a 4-2 victory.

At the beginning of the 2018 K League Classic campaign, Son joined Jeonbuk Hyundai Motors on a four year contract. He would make his debut in a AFC Champions League game on 13 February 2018 against Kashiwa Reysol in a match that ended in a 3-2 victory. His league debut would come on 1 March 2018 against Ulsan Hyundai FC in a match that ended in a 2-0 victory. This was followed by his first goal for the club 8 April 2018 in a league game against his old club Pohang Steelers, in a game that ended in a 2-0 victory. After the game he would start to establish himself as a regular within the team and was part of the squad that went on to win the league title at the end of the season. This would be followed by another league title at the end of the 2019 K League 1 campaign. In the 2020 K League 1 campaign the club would achieve a double in winning the league and 2020 Korean FA Cup, while Son would personally win the Most Valuable Player award.

On 13 January 2021, Son joined top tier Chinese football club Shandong Taishan for the start of the 2021 Chinese Super League campaign. He made his debut for the club on 20 April 2021 in a league game against Chongqing Liangjiang Athletic that ended in a 2-0 victory. He would immediately establish himself as an integral member of the teams midfield that went on to the win the 2021 Chinese Super League title and 2021 Chinese FA Cup. This would be followed up by him winning the 2022 Chinese FA Cup with them the next season.
Fulham FC and Southampton were keen to sign the player during the winter transfer window after a good performance for Shandong Taishan F.C. but the deal fell through after a fee could not be agreed between the two sides.

International career
Son Jun-ho would make his first senior appearance for South Korea in a friendlies match on 27 January 2018 against Moldova, where he came on as a substitute for Kim Sung-Joon in a 1-0 victory.

Career statistics
.

Honours

Club 
Jeonbuk Hyundai Motors
 K League 1: 2018, 2019, 2020
 KFA Cup: 2020

Shandong Taishan
 Chinese Super League: 2021
 Chinese FA Cup: 2021, 2022

International
South Korea U23
 Asian Games Gold Medal: 2014

South Korea
 EAFF E-1 Football Championship: 2019

Individual 
 K League 1 top assist provider: 2017
 K League 1 Most Valuable Player: 2020
 K League 1 Best XI: 2020

References

External links 

Son Jun-ho at Asian Games Incheon 2014

1992 births
Living people
Association football midfielders
South Korean footballers
Pohang Steelers players
Jeonbuk Hyundai Motors players
K League 1 players
Footballers at the 2014 Asian Games
Asian Games medalists in football
Asian Games gold medalists for South Korea
Medalists at the 2014 Asian Games
Sportspeople from North Gyeongsang Province
Shandong Taishan F.C. players
2022 FIFA World Cup players